The San Pablo River (Panama) is a river of Panama. It feeds into the Gulf of Montijo.

See also
List of rivers of Panama

References

 Rand McNally, The New International Atlas, 1993.
CIA map, 1995.

Rivers of Panama
Panamanian coasts of the Pacific Ocean
Drainage basins of the Pacific Ocean